Alethea is an English-language female first name derived from the Ancient Greek feminine noun ; . It is thus an equivalent of the name Verity, from the Latin feminine noun veritas, "truth". Use of the name dates from the 16th century with Alethea Talbot (1585–1654), the youngest daughter of Gilbert Talbot, 7th Earl of Shrewsbury (later Countess of Arundel following her marriage to Thomas Howard, 21st Earl of Arundel). The name as used for the daughter of a wealthy nobleman in the Renaissance era in England would certainly have been pronounced  , that is as an Ancient Greek word, as the father would have received a thorough education in Ancient Greek and would thus be aware of the correct pronunciation. Women named Alethea include:

Alethea Arnaquq-Baril, Inuk Canadian filmmaker
Alethea Charlton (1931–1976), British actress
Alethea Garstin (1894–1978), English painter and Royal Academician
Alethea Hayter OBE (1911–2006), English author and British Council Representative
Alethea Howard, Countess of Arundel (1585–1654), née Talbot, wife of Thomas Howard, 21st Earl of Arundel
Alethea Kontis (born 1976), American author and editor living in Titusville, Florida
Alethea Lewis (1749–1827), English novelist, born at Acton, near Nantwich, Cheshire
Alethea McGrath, Australian actress
Alethea Paul, English footballer

See also
 Aletheia (disambiguation) 
 Aleta (disambiguation)
 Letha (disambiguation)

Sources
Campbell, Mike, Behind the Name: Meaning, Origin and History of the Name Alethea

References